This is a list of candidates for the 1913 New South Wales state election. The election was held on 6 December 1913.

Retiring Members
Note: Lachlan Labor MLA Andrew Kelly died on 3 September 1913, shortly before the parliament was dissolved.

Labor
John McNeill MLA (Pyrmont)
John Meehan MLA (Darling)

Liberal
Fred Downes MLA (Camden)
David Fell MLA (Lane Cove)
George Hindmarsh MLA (Rous)
William Taylor MLA (St George)

Legislative Assembly
Sitting members are shown in bold text. Successful candidates are highlighted in the relevant colour.

See also
 Results of the 1913 New South Wales state election
 Members of the New South Wales Legislative Assembly, 1913–1917

Notes

References

1913